L'Islet is a regional county municipality in the Chaudière-Appalaches region of Quebec, Canada.

The county seat is Saint-Jean-Port-Joli.

Geography

Adjacent counties and municipalities
 Kamouraska Regional County Municipality – northeast
 Aroostook County, Maine – southeast
 Montmagny Regional County Municipality – southwest
 Charlevoix Regional County Municipality – northwest

Subdivisions
There are 14 subdivisions within the RCM:

Cities & Towns (1)
 Saint-Pamphile

Municipalities (10)
 L'Islet
 Saint-Adalbert
 Saint-Aubert
 Saint-Damase-de-L'Islet
 Sainte-Félicité
 Sainte-Perpétue
 Saint-Jean-Port-Joli
 Saint-Marcel
 Saint-Omer
 Saint-Roch-des-Aulnaies
 Tourville

Parishes (3)
 Saint-Cyrille-de-Lessard
 Sainte-Louise

Transportation

Access Routes
Highways and numbered routes that run through the municipality, including external routes that start or finish at the county border:

 Autoroutes
 

 Principal Highways
 

 Secondary Highways
 
 
 

 External Routes
 None

See also
 List of regional county municipalities and equivalent territories in Quebec

References

External links
  L'Islet Regional County Municipality

Regional county municipalities in Chaudière-Appalaches
Census divisions of Quebec